Arthur Aesbacher (1 April 1923 – 10 October 2020) was a Swiss artist.

Aesbacher was born in Geneva, Switzerland in April 1923. He studied in Paris at the Académie de la Grande Chaumière and at the Académie Julian, as a pupil of Fernand Léger. He worked primarily as a poster artist with torn posters, composed of various pictorial elements. He later worked in typography. Aesbacher died in Paris October 2020 at the age of 97.

References

  "Arthur Aeschbacher" at l'Encyclopédie audiovisuelle de l'art contemporain
  http://www.larousse.fr/encyclopedie/peinture/Aeschbacher/150779
 https://web.archive.org/web/20160304120118/http://www.whitfordfineart.com/artist/biography/200/arthur_aeschbacher

External Links 

 Archivio Conz

1923 births
2020 deaths
Artists from Geneva
Swiss graphic designers
Swiss poster artists
Swiss typographers and type designers